Radamel Falcao is a Colombian professional footballer who represents the Colombia national football team as a striker. He made his debut for his country in a 3–1 friendly defeat to Uruguay in February 2007. His first goal came in his second game for Colombia, the only score in a victory over Montenegro in the 2007 Kirin Cup. , Falcao is his country's top scorer with 36 international goals in 102 games. He surpassed the previous record of 25 goals, held by Arnoldo Iguarán, when he scored in a 2–2 draw with Spain in a friendly in June 2017. Falcao scored nine goals during Colombia's 2014 FIFA World Cup qualification campaign, but an injury sustained while playing for his club team Monaco in January 2014 ruled him out of the finals.  His first FIFA World Cup finals appearance came four years later in the 2018 FIFA World Cup, with his 74th cap, against Japan in a group stage match in June 2018. His first goal in the tournament came in his following game, a 3–0 group stage victory over Poland.

, Falcao has not scored an international hat-trick, but has scored twice in a single international match on four occasions, against Bolivia, Paraguay, Chile and Bahrain. He has scored more goals in friendlies than in any other format, with seventeen, and thirteen goals in qualifying for the FIFA World Cup. Two of his goals came in the Copa América, one in the FIFA World Cup finals and two in the Kirin Cup. Falcao has scored more goals against Bolivia and Chile (four) than any other opponents. Nine of his goals have been scored at the Estadio Metropolitano Roberto Meléndez, three at other venues in Colombia, with the remainder being scored abroad. Falcao's most recent goal came in a 2–0 win against Paraguay in a friendly in Fort Lauderdale on 19 November 2022.

Goals

Colombia score listed first, score column indicates score after each Falcao goal.

Statistics

Notes

References

Falcao, Radamel, goals
Falcao, Radamel, goals
Falcao, Radamel